Workable Software is a software-as-a-service (SAAS) that provides applicant tracking system (ATS) and recruitment software to support and manage the hiring process.

It was founded in Athens, Greece, but it is now based in Boston, Massachusetts.

History
It was founded in 2012 in Athens, Greece, Nikos Moraitakis and Spyros Magiatis. It later moved its headquarters to London, England and Boston, Massachusetts in 2014.

In 2014, Workable received a $1.5 million investment from Greylock Israel to further develop its platform. Previously, it received an investment from Openfund in 2013.

In 2015, Workable received an investment of $27 million in Series B funding from Balderton Capital and others.

In 2018, Zouk Capital invested $50 million in Workable.

In 2020, Workable was included in the FT 1000 list.

Platform
Workable is a cloud-based recruitment platform for small and medium enterprises (SMEs). Its software helps businesses automate their candidate sourcing and screening processes. The software takes recruiting and personal data from online publications and, based on that, its predictive algorithms recommend candidates for a particular position. The software can also schedule interviews and send follow-up emails. It uses a pay-as-you-go model for smaller companies.

Reception
Workable was reviewed by Juan Martinez and Gadjo Sevilla of PCMag in 2019 and wrote positively about the software. Similarly, its platform was reviewed by TechRadar in 2022.

References

2012 establishments in Greece
2012 software
Administrative software
Software companies of Greece